The Judo competition at the 2009 Asian Martial Arts Games took place from 2 August to 3 August at the Thai-Japanese Youth Center.

Medalists

Men

Women

Medal table

Results

Men

60 kg
2 August

66 kg
2 August

73 kg
2 August

81 kg
2 August

90 kg
3 August

100 kg
3 August

+100 kg
3 August

Women

48 kg
2 August

52 kg
2 August

57 kg
2 August

63 kg
2 August

70 kg
3 August

78 kg
3 August

+78 kg
3 August

References
 Official website – Judo Results

2009 Asian Martial Arts Games events
Asian Martial Arts Games
Asian Martial Arts Games